(A Rare Thing, or Beauty and Honesty) is an opera by the composer Vicente Martín y Soler. It takes the form of a dramma giocoso in two acts. The libretto, by Lorenzo Da Ponte, is based on the play  by Luis Vélez de Guevara. The opera was first performed at the Burgtheater, Vienna, on 17 November 1786. It was a huge success and was shown 78 times. Mozart quotes a melody from this opera, "", in the orchestral accompaniment to the trio  of the finale of Don Giovanni.

Roles

Synopsis
The town mayor and the Spanish prince Don Giovanni try to seduce the virtuous Lilla, who is engaged to Lubino. The queen finds out and resolves the state of affairs so Lilla is able to marry her beloved.

Notes

External links

Details and Italian libretto

Italian-language operas
1786 operas
Operas by Vicente Martín y Soler
Opera world premieres at the Burgtheater
Operas
Operas based on plays